El Dorado is city and county seat of Butler County, Kansas, United States.  It is situated along the Walnut River in the central part of Butler County and located in south-central Kansas.  As of the 2020 census, the population of the city was 12,870.  It is home to Butler Community College.

History

El Dorado was laid out and platted in 1868. The name is of Spanish origin meaning "golden land". El Dorado was incorporated in 1870.

In 1877, the Florence, El Dorado, and Walnut Valley Railroad Company built a branch line from Florence to El Dorado; in 1881 it was extended to Douglass, and later to Arkansas City. The line was leased and operated by the Atchison, Topeka and Santa Fe Railway. The line from Florence to El Dorado was abandoned in 1942. The original branch line connected Florence, Burns, De Graff, El Dorado, Augusta, Douglass, Rock, Akron, Winfield, and Arkansas City.

In 1915, the El Dorado Oil Field was the first oil field that was found using science/geologic mapping, and part of the Mid-Continent oil province.  By 1918, the El Dorado Oil Field was the largest single field producer in the United States, and was responsible for 12.8% of national oil production and 9% of the world production.  It was deemed by some as "the oil field that won World War I".

In 1916, there was an anti-black race riot in El Dorado after an incident between a black shoe shiner and a white oil worker. Large numbers of black families removed their household goods and moved out of El Dorado.

In 1943, German and Italian prisoners of World War II were brought to Kansas and other Midwest states as a means of solving the labor shortage caused by American men serving in the war effort. Large internment camps were established in Kansas: Camp Concordia, Camp Funston (at Fort Riley), Camp Phillips (at Salina under Fort Riley). Fort Riley established 12 smaller branch camps, including El Dorado. Prisoners commonly volunteered to help work on local farms; this enabled them to spend time outside the camp, socialize and eat better food than that provided by prison guards. In some cases, smaller structures constructed by the work details still stand.

On June 10, 1958, a tornado hit El Dorado and killed 13 people. In 2008, the city built a memorial at Graham Park in remembrance of the dead.

Geography
El Dorado is located at  (37.821117, −96.858281). The city is situated along the western bank of the Walnut River, southwest of El Dorado Lake. The Kansas Turnpike, designated as Interstate 35, bypasses northwest of the city.

Climate
The climate in this area is characterized by hot, humid summers and generally mild to cool winters.  According to the Köppen Climate Classification system, El Dorado has a humid subtropical climate, abbreviated "Cfa" on climate maps.

Demographics

El Dorado is part of the Wichita Metropolitan Statistical Area.

2010 census
As of the census of 2010, there were 13,021 people, 5,227 households, and 3,277 families residing in the city. The racial makeup of the city was 91.8% White, 2.3% African American, 1.1% Native American, 0.4% Asian, 0.1% Pacific Islander, 1.5% from other races, and 2.9% from two or more races. Hispanic or Latino of any race were 4.7% of the population.

There were 5,227 households, of which 31.9% had children under the age of 18 living with them, 44.8% were married couples living together, 12.3% had a female householder with no husband present, 5.6% had a male householder with no wife present, and 37.3% were non-families. 31.0% of all households were made up of individuals, and 13% had someone living alone who was 65 years of age or older. The average household size was 2.39 and the average family size was 2.98.

The median age in the city was 34 years. 24.9% of residents were under the age of 18; 14.1% were between the ages of 18 and 24; 23.1% were from 25 to 44; 23.1% were from 45 to 64; and 14.9% were 65 years of age or older. The gender makeup of the city was 48.2% male and 51.8% female.

2000 census
As of the U.S. Census in 2000, there were 12,057 people, 5,068 households, and 3,182 families residing in the city. The racial makeup of the city was 94.32% White, 1.37% Black or African American, 1.07% Native American, 0.22% Asian, 0.07% Pacific Islander, 1.06% from other races, and 1.89% from two or more races. Hispanic or Latino of any race were 2.93% of the population.

There were 5,068 households, out of which 30.4% had children under the age of 18 living with them, 48.3% were married couples living together, 10.6% had a female householder with no husband present, and 37.2% were non-families. 31.9% of all households were made up of individuals, and 14.2% had someone living alone who was 65 years of age or older. The average household size was 2.33 and the average family size was 2.94.

In the city, the population was spread out, with 25.2% under the age of 18, 10.4% from 18 to 24, 26.6% from 25 to 44, 20.1% from 45 to 64, and 17.7% who were 65 years of age or older. The median age was 36 years. For every 100 females, there were 91.8 males. For every 100 females age 18 and over, there were 87.0 males.

The median income for a household in the city was $33,098, and the median income for a family was $40,461. Males had a median income of $31,648 versus $21,806 for females. The per capita income for the city was $18,458. About 10.4% of families and 13.5% of the population were below the poverty line, including 17.7% of those under age 18 and 6.1% of those age 65 or over.

Economy

The El Dorado Refinery is currently owned and operated by HollyFrontier, is situated on the southwest edge of El Dorado. It was constructed and originally owned by what would later become Skelly Oil. Later, the refinery changed hands and was rebranded after Skelly was purchased by Getty Oil, and then rebranded again after Texaco attempted to purchase Getty. In 2011 it was rebranded again when Frontier Oil and Holly Corporation merged. El Dorado Refinery is the largest in Kansas.

Education

El Dorado is home to Butler Community College.

Most of the community is served by El Dorado USD 490 public school district, which has one high school, one middle school, and three grade schools.  The west side of El Dorado is served by Circle USD 375 public school district.

Sports
Butler Community College fields teams in both men's (mascot: Grizzlies) and women's (mascot: Lady Grizzlies) sports.  Butler competes in the NJCAA's Jayhawk Conference, and its teams have won numerous league and national accolades.  Butler's football team has won five NJCAA national championships (1981, 1998, 1999, 2003, 2007, and 2008), and also played in the NJCAA championship game in 2004 and 2010.  The 1985 squad also finished the season ranked #1 nationally.  The program has produced numerous NFL players, most notably Rudi Johnson. Butler's men's basketball program also has a rich tradition, including a national championship in 1953, NJCAA national tournament runners-up in 1992 and 1993, a national tournament third-place finish in 1996, seven Jayhawk Conference championships since 1990, four NJCAA players of the year, ten NJCAA All-Americans, and three NBA draft picks.  Notable former Grizzlies with NBA experience include Stephen Jackson, Tony Allen, and Kasib Powell.  Butler's men's and women's track and cross-country teams also have won numerous conference, regional, and national accolades.

The El Dorado Broncos were a summer amateur baseball team composed primarily of college players.  The team competed within the Jayhawk League as part of the National Baseball Congress, or NBC.  The Broncos have won three NBC World Series in 1996, 1998 and 2009.  Several former Broncos players currently play in Major League Baseball, including Nate Robertson and Heath Bell .

Culture
In April 2010, the Hot Rod Cafe (formerly the El Dorado theater on Main Street) was filmed for the documentary reality television series American Pickers episode "Easy Riders", which aired July 26, 2010.

The 1969 film The Gypsy Moths was filmed in part in El Dorado. It featured Burt Lancaster, Deborah Kerr, Gene Hackman, William Windom and Bonnie Bedelia.

Parks and Recreation
The City of El Dorado maintains an extensive parks and recreation system, including: 12 neighborhood parks, 12 playgrounds, 5 soccer fields, 4 baseball fields, 4 softball fields, 2 spray parks, 2 pools, 2 tennis courts, 2 outdoor basketball courts, a baseball stadium, an 18-hole disc golf course, and a 6.3 mile bike path.

In addition, the community boasts a new athletic complex. The venue was completed in 2012 by the Educational Facilities Authority of Butler County, which consists of representatives from the City of El Dorado, Butler Community College and El Dorado Schools (USD 490). The complex provides a venue for football, soccer, track and other community events.

El Dorado State Park is also located just beyond the city limits and provides many recreational activities, such as boating, fishing, hiking, swimming, horse trails and archery.

Media

Print
 Butler County Times-Gazette, local newspaper in El Dorado.
 The Wichita Eagle, major regional newspaper in Wichita.

Radio
El Dorado is served by numerous radio stations of the Wichita-Hutchinson listening market area, and satellite radio.  See Media in Wichita, Kansas.

Television
El Dorado is served by over-the-air ATSC digital TV of the Wichita-Hutchinson viewing market area, cable TV, and satellite TV.  See Media in Wichita, Kansas.

Notable people

 Granville Pearl Aikman, Kansas state judge, attorney
 Tom Borland, major league baseball pitcher 
 Beals Becker, major league baseball player
 Steve Brodie, actor
 Bobby Douglass, NFL football player
 Stanley Dunham, maternal grandfather of Barack Obama
 Alfred W. Ellet, Brigadier General in U.S. Civil War
 Maude Fulton, Broadway stage actress, playwright, screenwriter
 Ralph Graham, college football coach, pioneer of racial integration in college sports
 Sarah D. Grant, Arizona Court of Appeals judge, attorney
 Alex Graves,  film director, television director, television producer, screenwriter
 Larry Hartshorn former NFL football player
 Roger Marshall, former United States Representative, US Senator from Kansas, obstetrician
 Marion Koogler McNay, artist, philanthropist, founder of McNay Art Museum
 Robert L. Rodgers, US Congressman
 Emily Sander, murder victim, adult model
 Almon Brown Strowger, inventor of Strowger switch
 Mort Walker, cartoonist, creator of Beetle Bailey
 William Allen White, journalist
 Gerald Burton Winrod, anti-semitic evangelist

See also
 National Register of Historic Places listings in Butler County, Kansas
 Butler County Courthouse
 El Dorado Carnegie Library
 El Dorado Missouri Pacific Depot
 List of oil pipelines
 List of oil refineries

References

Further reading

External links

 City of El Dorado
 El Dorado – Directory of Public Officials
 El Dorado Chamber of Commerce
 El Dorado city map, KDOT

 
Cities in Kansas
County seats in Kansas
Cities in Butler County, Kansas
Wichita, KS Metropolitan Statistical Area
Populated places established in 1871
1871 establishments in Kansas